Vadym Rozhdestvenskiy (born 6 February 1967) is a Ukrainian water polo player. He competed in the men's tournament at the 1996 Summer Olympics.

References

1967 births
Living people
Ukrainian male water polo players
Olympic water polo players of Ukraine
Water polo players at the 1996 Summer Olympics
Place of birth missing (living people)